Torslanda IK is a local sports club in Torslanda, Gothenburg, Sweden.

History
Torslanda IK was founded in 1944 by Anders Tullock, Bengt Tullock and Erik Danielsson.  In the 1950s the sports club created sections for football, table tennis, handball, and hockey.  In the 1960s gymnastics and in 1972 bowling were added.

The men's A football team won Division VI titles in 1981 and 1985. The men's A team advanced to Division IV in 1987, winning that title in 1996.

The club's original clubhouse was built in 1979 at Torslandavallen but was destroyed by fire in 1992. A replacement clubhouse was inaugurated in March 1994.

Torslanda IK are affiliated to the Göteborgs Fotbollförbund.

Season to season

* League restructuring in 2006 resulted in a new division being created at Tier 3 and subsequent divisions dropping a level.

Current squad

External links
Torslanda IK official website

Footnotes

Football clubs in Västra Götaland County
Association football clubs established in 1944
1944 establishments in Sweden